The 2014 season of the Belgian Football League (BFL) is the regular season played in the Belgium. The championshipgame is the Belgian Bowl XXVII.

Regular season

Regular season standings
W = Wins, L = Losses, T = Ties, PCT = Winning Percentage, PF= Points For, PA = Points Against

 – clinched seed to the playoffs

Post season

The Belgian Bowl XXVII was held on June 29, 2014 in Izegem.  The Ghent Gators won over the Brussels Tigers.  It was the first time for the Ghent Gators to win the national trophy.

References

American football in Belgium
BFL
BFL